Qubool Hai 2.0 is an Indian Hindi/Urdu-language web series, starring Karan Singh Grover and Surbhi Jyoti. Produced by Mrinal Jha under MAJ Productions, this web series is directed by Glen Barretto and Ankush Mohla. Also, it premiered on ZEE5 on 12 March 2021.

Cast

Main 
 Karan Singh Grover as Asad Ahmed Khan–Dilshad and Rashid Ahmed Khan's son, Zoya's love interest. 
 Surbhi Jyoti as Zoya Farooqi / Angel Simmons– Gen.Bhakhtiyar Farooqi and Shama Farooqi's daughter, Asad's love interest

Recurring
 Mandira Bedi as Damini Sood 
 Arif Zakaria as Gen.Bhakhtiyar Farooqi– Major General of Pakistan's Islamabad force, Zoya's caring father and Shama's ex-husband
 Gurpreet Bedi as Sana Shaikh
 Lillete Dubey as Nilofer Farooqi– Bakhtiyar's younger sister and Zoya's pupphi (aunt)
 Saurabh Raj Jain as Hassan Farooqi
 Nehalaxmi Iyer as Najma Ahmed Khan– Dilshad and Rashid Ahmed Khan's younger daughter and Asad's beloved younger sister who is a foody and technology and hacking queen
 Aryamann Seth as Ayaan Ahmed Khan- Rashid Ahmed Khan's son and Asad and Najma's half-brother
 Abhishek Sharma as Zoheb Farooqi
 Sonja Iris as Anika Farooqi- Zoheb's wife
 Priyal Gor as Aasma Qureshi– Asad's ex-girlfriend
 Vishal Nayak as RAW agent and Damini Sood's assistant
 Kavita Ghaias Shama Farooqi– Zoya's mother and Gen.Bhakhtiyar Farooqi's ex-wife
Ankit Raaj as Salmaan Ansari 
 Gulfam Khan as Fatima Ansari - Salmaan's mother
 Shalini Kapoor Sagar as Dilshad- Rashid's ex-wife and Asad and Najma's mother
 Daksh Sharma as Rizwan Sheikh
 Vaquar Shaikh as Rashid Ahmed Khan - Dilshad's ex-husband and Asad, Ayaan and Najma's father

Episodes

Season 1

References

External links 
 
 Qubool Hai 2.0 on ZEE5

ZEE5 original programming
2021 web series debuts
 Hindi-language web series 
 Indian drama web series